Wangen an der Aare Castle is a castle in the municipality of Wangen an der Aare of the Canton of Bern in Switzerland.  It is a Swiss heritage site of national significance.

Gallery

See also
 List of castles in Switzerland

References

Cultural property of national significance in the canton of Bern
Castles in the Canton of Bern